Various opinion polls were conducted in advance of the 2019 European Parliament election. Before the April delay, a number of polls asked respondents to imagine how they would vote in a then-hypothetical scenario in which European elections would be held.

Great Britain

Graphical summary 
The chart below depicts opinion polls conducted for the 2019 European Parliament elections in the UK; trendlines are local regressions (LOESS).

National opinion polling

MRP and RPP estimates 
ComRes, like YouGov in the 2017 general election, employed multilevel regression with poststratification (MRP) as well as regularised prediction and poststratification (RPP) to model voting behavior in every region in Great Britain using large numbers of survey interviews on voting intentions (an approach described as identifying "patterns in responses across [regions] that have similar characteristics, and then work[ing] out the implications of those patterns for each").

London only

Scotland only

Wales only

Northern Ireland 
The following polls reflect first preferences only.

Notes

References

2019 elections in the United Kingdom
European Parliament elections in the United Kingdom
Opinion polling in the United Kingdom
United Kingdom